The Dutch Quarter (Holländisches Viertel) is a neighborhood in Potsdam, consisting of 134 red Dutch brick buildings, almost all of which have been renovated. It was built from 1733 to 1740 and designed by Jan Bouman following the order of Frederick William I of Prussia.

References

Buildings and structures in Potsdam
Brick buildings and structures
Buildings and structures by Dutch architects
Tourist attractions in Potsdam